The Moclips Highway, also designated as BIA Road 26, is a rural east–west highway in the U.S. state of Washington.

The Moclips Highway can be combined with Washington State Route 109 and Highway 101 for a scenic tour of the Olympic Peninsula.

The  is a fish hatchery on the Quinault Reservation, operated by the United States Fish and Wildlife Service as part of the National Fish Hatchery System.

References

Sources

Roads in Washington (state)
Transportation in Grays Harbor County, Washington